Behtarabad (also Romanized as Behtarābād) is a village in Gonbaki Rural District, Gonbaki District, Rigan County, Kerman Province, Iran. At the 2006 census, its population was 157, in 35 families.

References 

Populated places in Rigan County